The women's team tennis event was part of the tennis programme and took place between December 8 and 11, at the Muang Thong Thani Tennis Centre.

Schedule
All times are Indochina Time (UTC+07:00)

Results

Quarterfinals

Semifinals

Final

References 

Tennis at the 1998 Asian Games